DWIS (98.9 FM), broadcasting as Mom's Radio 98.9, was a radio station owned and operated by Southern Broadcasting Network. The station's studio and transmitter were located in Brgy. Cabaroan Laud, Vigan.

References

Radio stations established in 1984
Radio stations in Ilocos Sur
Radio stations disestablished in 2018
Defunct radio stations in the Philippines